Marc Allégret (22 December 1900 – 3 November 1973) was a French screenwriter, photographer and film director.

Biography
Born in Basel, Basel-Stadt, Switzerland, he was the elder brother of Yves Allégret. Marc was educated to be a lawyer in Paris, but while accompanying his lover André Gide on a trip in 1927 to the Congo in Africa, he recorded the trip on film, after which he chose to pursue a career in the motion picture industry. He is credited with helping develop the careers of Simone Simon, Michèle Morgan, Jean-Pierre Aumont, Danièle Delorme, Odette Joyeux, Jeanne Moreau, Brigitte Bardot, Jean-Paul Belmondo, Raimu, Gérard Philipe, Louis Jourdan, and Roger Vadim.

Allégret collaborated on the famous Dada Marcel Duchamp short film Anemic Cinema in 1926 and served as an assistant director to Robert Florey and Augusto Genina. In 1931 he directed his first feature film, Mam’zelle Nitouche. He received acclaim for his subsequent film Fanny and went on to a long career during which he wrote numerous scripts and directed more than fifty films.
 
Allégret died in 1973 and was interred in the Cimetière des Gonards in Versailles, France.

Filmography 

 1927 : Travels in the Congo (documentary)
 1930 :  (short)
 1931 : 
 1931 : J'ai quelque chose à vous dire (short)
 1931 :  (short)
 1931 : 
 1931 : Black and White 
 1932 : La Petite Chocolatière
 1932 : Fanny
 1934 : Zouzou
 1934 : 
 1934 : 
 1934 : Sans famille
 1935 : Les Beaux jours
 1936 : Under Western Eyes
 1936 : Adventure in Paris
 1936 : The Terrible Lovers
 1937 : Gribouille
 1937 : Woman of Malacca 
 1937 : Another World (German-language version of Woman of Malacca)
 1938 : Orage
 1938 : Entrée des artistes
 1939 : Le Corsaire
 1941 : Parade en sept nuits
 1942 : L'Arlésienne
 1942 : The Beautiful Adventure
 1943 : Les Deux timides
 1944 : Les Petites du quai aux fleurs
 1945 : Félicie Nanteuil
 1946 : Lunegarde
 1946 : Pétrus
 1947 : Blanche Fury
 1950 : Blackmailed
 1950 : Maria Chapdelaine
 1951 :  (documentary)
 1952 : 
 1953 : Julietta
 1954 : Loves of Three Queens
 1955 : School for Love
 1955 : Lady Chatterley's Lover
 1956 : En effeuillant la marguerite a.k.a. Plucking the Daisy a.k.a. Mademoiselle Striptease
 1957 : Love Is at Stake
 1958 : Be Beautiful But Shut Up
 1958 : Sunday Encounter
 1959 : 
 1961 : 
 1962 : Tales of Paris
 1963 : 
 1966 : Lumière (documentary)
 1970 : Le Bal du Comte d'Orgel

References

External links
 
 Marc Allegrét papers, Beinecke Library, Yale University.

1900 births
1973 deaths
20th-century French male writers
French film directors
French male screenwriters
20th-century French screenwriters
LGBT film directors
French LGBT screenwriters
Burials at the Cimetière des Gonards
20th-century French LGBT people